The Mitchell House is a historic house at 1183 Main Street in Batesville, Arkansas.  It is a two-story wood-frame structure, with weatherboard siding, and a cross-gable roof configuration.  The front facade is dominated by a gambreled gable projecting over the front porch, which is fashioned out of locally sourced limestone, including the facing on the supporting piers.  The house was built in 1917 to a design by Arkansas architect Charles L. Thompson.

The house was listed on the National Register of Historic Places in 1982.

See also
National Register of Historic Places listings in Independence County, Arkansas

References

Houses on the National Register of Historic Places in Arkansas
Houses completed in 1917
Houses in Batesville, Arkansas
National Register of Historic Places in Independence County, Arkansas
1917 establishments in Arkansas
Dutch Colonial Revival architecture in the United States